Llanstephan Cliffs is a Site of Special Scientific Interest in Carmarthenshire, Wales.

See also
List of SSSIs in Carmarthenshire

References

Sites of Special Scientific Interest in Carmarthen & Dinefwr
Cliffs of Carmarthenshire